István Timár-Geng (26 March 1923 – 30 August 1999) was a Hungarian basketball player. He competed in the men's tournament at the 1948 Summer Olympics.

References

1923 births
1999 deaths
Hungarian men's basketball players
Olympic basketball players of Hungary
Basketball players at the 1948 Summer Olympics
People from Turda